Deep River-Columbia Manufacturing Company was a historic textile mill complex located at Ramseur, Randolph County, North Carolina.  The brick mill complex was built between about 1850 and 1920. The main mill building consisted of a two-story, 11-bay, gable-roofed section built about 1850, with a three-story, 13-bay addition constructed in 1888.  A four-story stair tower was added to the mill between 1885 and 1888. The mill closed in January 1963.  It has been demolished.

It was added to the National Register of Historic Places in 1978.

References

Textile mills in North Carolina
Industrial buildings and structures on the National Register of Historic Places in North Carolina
Industrial buildings completed in 1850
Buildings and structures in Randolph County, North Carolina
National Register of Historic Places in Randolph County, North Carolina